Delminichthys jadovensis is a species of cyprinid fish.

It is found only in Croatia, in the karst region. First scientifically described in 2002, P. jadovensis is found at only one location, a stream in the Jadova River. The populations seems to be declining even here, and considered critically endangered.

References

Sources
 

Delminichthys
Endemic fauna of Croatia
Cyprinid fish of Europe
Fish described in 2002
Taxonomy articles created by Polbot